Beulah (Australian postcode 7306) is a small township on the north-west coast of Tasmania south of Devonport, Tasmania, under the foothills of Mount Roland, Tasmania.  The closest town of consequence is Sheffield, Tasmania.

The hamlet of Lower Beulah lies, perversely, higher up the foothills of Mount Roland, to the south of the main township.

Sport
Beulah has one of the oldest cricket clubs  in Tasmania. The Beulah Bushrangers Cricket Club was founded in 1896, Cricket was played in the Beulah area and surrounding districts prior to this. The side during the 1930s consisted of a team  made up from the one family. It was the Dawkins family who had lived at Beulah made up this side. Brothers Lewis, Cecil Dawkins who played for Beulah club into their 50s and competed in the Roland Cricket Association and the Kentish Cricket Association with Beulah from the early 1930s until the 1950s when the club went into recess. Beulah won the inaugural Kentish Cricket Association A Grade Premiership in 1946.The Club was reformed in 1979–80 season competing in the Kentish Association by Craig T Davey and Grant Youd after a 26 year recess. A golden age occurred at the club during the 80s with the team winning flags in 1987,1988,and 1989 predominantly under the leadership of Brendon Davey. The young team was very strong in the batting department scoring over 400 runs from 50 overs on 7 occasions throughout the latter part of the decade. In 2003 a seasoned Beulah outfit won its last premiership in Kentish. The club continued until 2004 when it went into recess after the folding of the KCA. The club reformed in 2010–2011 in the Mersey Valley Cricket Association with A reserve and B grade teams  by club legends  Davey & Youd, local Cricketing identity Quentin von Stieglitz, Ashley McCarthy and Jamie Smithurst. The club has made finals in their first year in the MVCA under the leadership of former Tasmanian Gillette cup Captain and Opening batsman Kerry Mace (A Grade) and Quentin von Stieglitz (B Grade). By 2012 there were eleven members of the Davey family playing at the club. Since 2010-2011 season Beulah has been into recess once for the 2016/2017 season. In recent years Beulah has won flags in 2015/2016 A Reserve and 2019/2020 in B Grade in the Mersey Valley Cricket Association. In 2021/22 season club stalwart Craig T Davey played his 500th game for the club. The only player to achieve this feat. In season 2022/23 Davey along with club legend Brendon Davey continue to play as co-captains of Beulah's one remaining team in MVCA. The two are Beulah's most capped players and are now aged in their sixties.

References

Localities of Kentish Council
Towns in Tasmania